Gilabad (also Romanized as Gīlābād; also known as Gelābad) is a village in Sarab Rural District, Giyan District, Nahavand County, Hamadan Province, Iran. At the 2006 census, its population was 1,878, in 514 families.

References 

Populated places in Nahavand County